Toby Anstis (born 14 December 1970) is an English radio and television presenter. He is a presenter on Heart and spin-off station Heart Dance.

Early life
Originally from Northampton, Anstis was educated at Desborough School, an all-boys school in Maidenhead, Berkshire. He graduated in psychology and business studies from the University of Surrey Roehampton. 

Toby was adopted along with his twin sister as a child; his biological father was Italian and his biological mother, Gina, was English. He only met his birth parents as an adult and has commented that he was 'lucky' to have good adoptive parents.

Career

Anstis began his career on BBC1's Broom Cupboard. He was the show's last presenter and also spent three years on CBBC. He worked on the music show The O-Zone on BBC1 and BBC2, co-hosted Children in Need two years running, presented cricket films for Grandstand, and hosted live outside broadcasts on National Lottery Live for the BBC.

Anstis also presented the first series of Trust Me I'm A Holiday rep on Channel 5, has won three episodes of Pointless on BBC1, hosted TV Scrabble, and guested on TV shows such as Ant & Dec's Saturday Night Take Away, Celebrity Egg Heads, and This Morning, as well as guest-starring in Mongrels on BBC2, and co-hosting a Celebrity Through the Keyhole with Keith Lemon and appearing in the spin-off show Lemon La Vida Loca.

In 2020, during the COVID-19 crisis, Anstis joined the supergroup The Celebs with Frank Bruno and X Factor winner Sam Bailey to raise money for both Alzheimer's Society and Action for Children. They recorded a new rendition of Merry Christmas Everyone by Shakin' Stevens and it was released digitally on 11. December 2020 on independent record label Saga Entertainment.

Filmography

TV

I'm Famous and Frightened! (2004) – Guest
Children in Need – Co-presenter
Trust Me – I'm a Holiday Rep – Presenter
The Mint – Guest
I'm a Celebrity...Get Me Out of Here! (2006) – Participant
Big Brother's Big Mouth (2006) – Pundit
Ready Steady Cook (2009)
The Alan Titchmarsh Show (2009)
Mongrels (TV series) (2010)
Eggheads (2011)
Loose Women – Loose Man
Pointless Celebrities (2012,2016,2019) – Winning Contestant
Celebrity Come Dine with Me: Christmas Special – Contestant
Who's Doing the Dishes? (2015) – Celebrity chef
Hacker's Birthday Bash: 30 Years of Children's BBC (2015) – Himself
A Place in the Sun (2017) - Himself
Merry Christmas Everyone (2020) - Himself
Richard Osman's House of Games (2022) - Himself

References

External links

Heart's Club Classics with Toby Anstis on Heart Radio

1970 births
Living people
British radio personalities
British television presenters
People from Northampton
Anstis, Tony
Alumni of the University of Roehampton
I'm a Celebrity...Get Me Out of Here! (British TV series) participants